Ugo Bellagamba (born 1972) is a French science fiction writer who won the Prix Rosny-Aîné in 2005 (best short story) and 2010 (best novel : Tancrède, une uchronie), as well as the Grand Prix de l'Imaginaire in 2008 (best non fiction : Solutions non satisfaisante, une anatomie de Robert A. Heinlein). An associate professor at the Law school of the University of Nice, he teaches the history of law.

References

External links
 Homepage

French science fiction writers
1972 births
Living people
French male novelists